Papillon is a 2017 drama film directed by Michael Noer and also the last film by Red Granite Pictures.  It tells the story of French convict Henri Charrière (Charlie Hunnam), nicknamed Papillon ("butterfly"), who was falsely imprisoned in 1933 in the notorious Devil's Island penal colony and escaped in 1941 with the help of another convict, counterfeiter Louis Dega (Rami Malek). The film's screenplay is based on Charrière's autobiographies Papillon and Banco, as well as the former's 1973 film adaptation, which was written by Dalton Trumbo and Lorenzo Semple Jr. and starred Steve McQueen and Dustin Hoffman.

Papillon premiered on September 9, 2017, in the Special Presentations section at the 2017 Toronto International Film Festival.

Plot
Henri "Papillon" Charrière, a safecracker from the Parisian underworld, is framed for murder. Though he has an alibi from his lover, Nenette, Papillon is convicted and condemned to the notorious Devil's Island penal colony in French Guiana — a hellish prison from which nobody has escaped.

On the ship to South America, Papillon meets a quirky counterfeiter named Louis Dega. That evening Dega is awakened as two convicts murder a prisoner sleeping next to him in order to cut open his stomach and steal the money he had swallowed. Papillon forms an unlikely alliance with Dega, who is targeted by the other prisoners who suspect him of also hiding money. Papillon saves Dega's life and is punished for fighting by the guards. In exchange for Papillon's protection, Dega agrees to finance Papillon's escape, ultimately resulting in a bond of lasting friendship.

While Papillon and Dega are ordered to carry away a guillotined body, a guard starts to whip Dega.  Papillon strikes the guard with a rock and runs into the jungle for his first escape.  He is given two years of silent solitary confinement. After the warden learns he has been receiving extra food, his rations are cut in half until he gives up the name of his supplier. Papillon does not betray Dega.

The second escape plan is made from the prison infirmary, while Papillon is feigning insanity from his confinement. Dega does the warden's bookkeeping and has money to fund the escape. Celier has a connection to get a boat, and the sexually abused Maturette is the fourth to join the dangerous venture. Dega drugs the guards using pills meant to sedate a supposedly insane Papillon and the three others escape over the walls to the jungle, with Dega injuring his leg in the process, to reach a boat Dega paid for.  As a storm approaches, it is clear they will not all survive in the small leaky boat. Celier wants to kill the injured Dega but Papillon defends Dega, who stabs and kills Celier as he fights with Papillon. After a treacherous storm destroys their boat, the three survivors find themselves being cared for in a Colombian convent.  Their apparent freedom is short lived. The Colombian authorities arrive, kill Maturette, and return Papillon to Royal Island, where he is subjected to five years in solitary confinement.  Dega is sent to Devil's Island.

Papillon is released from solitary as a weathered older man and sent to Devil's Island, where the high cliffs provide a natural barrier for escape attempts. He finds Dega who has adjusted to prison life and has no interest in escape. Because a fall from the cliffs would mean certain death, Papillon bags coconuts together for a raft. During a swell of waves, he jumps from the cliffs and survives the fall.  The third escape is a success and he is a free man.  He writes a memoir based on his time in prison and escape attempts.

The movie postscript reads: "Over 80,000 prisoners were condemned to the penal colony in French Guiana, most of whom never returned to France. Henri Charriere's autobiography 'Papillon' became the number one bestseller for 21 weeks in France. To date, it has sold over 13 million copies in 30 languages. In 1970, the French Minister of Justice signed a decree allowing Charriere to return to France. For the remainder of his life, he lived a free man. The penal colony in French Guiana did not survive him".

Cast

 Charlie Hunnam as Henri "Papillon" Charrière
 Rami Malek as Louis Dega
 Christopher Fairbank as Jean Castilli
 Yorick van Wageningen as Warden Barrot
 Roland Møller as Celier
 Tommy Flanagan as Masked Breton
 Eve Hewson as Nenette
 Michael Socha as Julot
 Brian Vernel as Guittou
 Ian Beattie as Toussaint
 Nicholas Asbury as Commandant
 Nikola Kent as Deputy Warden Brioulet
 Slavko Sobin as El Caiman
 Joel Basman as Maturette
 Luka Peroš as Santini
 Demetri Goritsas as Jean-Pierre Castelnau

Production
Papillon was shot in different locations around Europe including Montenegro, Malta, and Belgrade, Serbia.

Release
Papillon was released in the United States by Bleecker Street on August 24, 2018.

Reception

Box office
The film debuted to $1.2 million from 544 theaters in its opening weekend, finishing 16th. , Papillon had grossed $2,335,896 in the United States and Canada, and $2,180,684 in other territories, for a total worldwide gross of $4,516,580.

Critical response
On Rotten Tomatoes the film has an approval rating of 52% based on reviews from 111 critics, with an average rating of 5.8/10. The website's critical consensus reads, "Papillon puts its own well-acted, solidly produced spin on a previously adapted tale, although it suffers in comparison to the 1973 version." On Metacritic, the film has a weighted average score of 51 out of 100, based on 31 critics, indicating "mixed or average reviews".

See also 

 Papillon (1973 film)
 Saint-Joseph Island

References

External links
 

2017 films
2010s prison films
2017 drama films
2010s French-language films
American crime drama films
American adventure drama films
Films based on non-fiction books
American prison films
Films about prison escapes
Films produced by Ram Bergman
Films set in jungles
Films set on Devil's Island
Remakes of American films
Films shot in Montenegro
Films shot in Malta
Films shot in Serbia
Films set in French Guiana
Films set in the French colonial empire
Films set in the 1930s
Red Granite Pictures films
2010s adventure drama films
Films scored by David Buckley
Films directed by Michael Noer
2010s English-language films
2010s American films
2017 multilingual films
American multilingual films